Rachmat is a given name. Notable people with the given name include:

Rachmat Afandi (born 1984), Indonesian footballer
Rachmat Irianto (born 1999), Indonesian footballer
Rachmat Kartolo (1938–2001), Indonesian actor and singer
Rachmat Latief (born 1988), Indonesian footballer
Rachmat Yasin (born 1963), Indonesian politician